Coccoloba gigantifolia is a species of flowering plant in the knotweed family Polygonaceae. It is endemic to the Madeira River Basin in the states of Amazonas and Rondonia in the central and southwestern Brazilian Amazon. This species resembles that of Coccoloba mollis but differs in that it has much larger leaves in its fertile branches.

Description
The huge leaves form a rosette at the top of the main trunk and each of the few branches. This tree does not appear to have an indigenous name.

Botanical history
The plant was first observed by botanists in the Canumã River, a tributary of Madeira River, during an expedition in 1982, but no specimen was collected due to lack of fertile parts. Again in 1986, an expedition led by the botanist Juan Revilla found and made a photographic record of a very large-leaved but sterile Coccoloba individual near Porto Velho city, in the state of Rondônia; again no herbarium specimen was collected. Between 1989 and 1993, some 14 individuals were found in several expeditions in Jamari National Forest Reserve; some large leaves were collected even though the specimens were sterile. Individuals of large-leaved Coccoloba were again photographed by Silvestre Silva in 1995 at a vicinal road connecting the city of Autazes to the left bank of the Madeira River, about 110 km southeast of Manaus. Finally, an August 2005 expedition in another area in the vicinity of Jamari Forest Reserve led to the collection of fertile samples of inflorescences along with fallen mature fruits and seeds beneath one individual tree.

Etymology
The specific epithet gigantifolia is in reference to the species unusual leaf proportion.

References

Endemic flora of Brazil
gigantifolia
Plants described in 2019